Irresistible Force is a 1993 American thriller starring Stacy Keach and Cynthia Rothrock as a pair of police officers.

Plot
A police sergeant (Keach) who is trying to avoid any trouble before his upcoming retirement receives an enthusiastic young female agent (Rothrock) as a new partner.

Cast
 Stacy Keach as Harris Stone
 Cynthia Rothrock as Charlotte Heller
 Paul Winfield as Commander Toole
 Kathleen Garrett as Arla Stone
 Michael Bacall as Jesse Delvechio
 Jerome Ehlers as Kurt
 Nicholas Hammond as Lieutenant Nash
 Christopher Neame as James Barron

Production
The outdoor scenes were filmed on the Gold Coast in Queensland, Australia while the interiors were shot at Warner Bros. Movie World on the Pacific Highway in Oxenford, Queensland.

Reception
Film critic Adrian Martin wrote:Filmed in a part of Australia that masquerades as America, Irresistible Force is in many ways a minor and derivative action film. Stacy Keach plays an old cop who battles a group of Die Hard-style neo-supremacist baddies occupying a high-tech shopping mall.

African-American director Kevin Hooks (Passenger 57, 1992) expertly throws in every conceivable cliché, right down to a mismatching buddy-cop for Keach. But this is where the film gets interesting, for the partner is none other than B movie legend Cynthia Rothrock.

Rothrock is one of the most exciting and engaging icons of contemporary exploitation cinema. Her persona is an unsettling mixture of classically feminine traits (such as a chic martial arts wardrobe) with an unstoppably masculine aggro. Most often presented as the 'angel of rage', Rothrock routinely murders or severely mutilates the men who have raped and tortured her.

In her previous B movies, this amazing Rothrock persona is never explained, either psychologically or sociologically. She is simply an almighty, irresistible force to be reckoned with.

This film introduces her to a mainstream audience rather more delicately. The script gives her lines about her unconventional family upbringing, her "bad attitude" towards authority, and her ability to "do the girl thing" when required. Keach functions as a dour father-teacher figure, taming her wildness.

References

External links

Review: Irresistible Force (1993 TV Movie): Die Hard in a shopping mall with Cynthia Rothtrock in the John McClane role. It's good! (Chrichton's World - Sept 2015)

Australian thriller films
1993 films
Films directed by Kevin Hooks
Films scored by David Michael Frank
1993 thriller films
1990s English-language films
1990s Australian films